Harry Huntt Ransom (November 22, 1908 – April 19, 1976) was a faculty member and administrator at the University of Texas, becoming the university's president in 1960, and ultimately served as the chancellor of the University of Texas System from 1961 to 1971.

Ransom was instrumental in founding the Humanities Research Center at the University of Texas at Austin (which became the Harry Ransom Center in 1983).  In 1978, at a cost of $2.4 million, the center acquired a complete copy of the Gutenberg Bible.

Ransom served on the National Commission for Libraries appointed by President Lyndon B. Johnson. 

Ransom was the only son of Harry Huntt and Marion Goodwin (Cunningham) Ransom. He was married in Galveston on August 11, 1951, to Hazel Louise Harrod. The couple had no children.

References

External links
A Guide to the Harry Huntt Ransom Papers, 1930-1990

1908 births
1976 deaths
People from Galveston, Texas
People from Hays County, Texas
Presidents of the University of Texas at Austin
Sewanee: The University of the South alumni
Yale University alumni
20th-century American academics